Jean-Frédéric Hermann (Strasbourg 1768–1793) was a French physician and naturalist mainly interested in entomology.

Son of Jean Hermann, he continued the index of his father’s collection, illustrating some species. He studied the comparative anatomy of the mouthparts of insects and mites publishing Mémoire aptérologique with his son in law Frédéric-Louis Hammer in 1804.

References

External links
Three works by Hermann digitized by the Universities of Strasbourg.

French entomologists
1768 births
1793 deaths
Scientists from Strasbourg
Physicians from Strasbourg